Jeremy Dean Giambi (September 30, 1974 – February 9, 2022) was an American outfielder and first baseman in Major League Baseball (MLB). He played for four teams from 1998 to 2003, primarily the Oakland Athletics, where he was a teammate of his older brother Jason Giambi during the club's division championship-winning seasons in 2000 and 2001. 

He enjoyed his best season in 2001, batting .283 with 12 home runs and 57 runs batted in (RBI), then hitting .308 in the Division Series loss to the New York Yankees. Following his brother's departure to the Yankees as a free agent in the ensuing offseason, Jeremy saw declining playing time with three teams over the next two seasons before finishing his career in the minor leagues.

Early life 
Jeremy Giambi was born in San Jose, California. Like his older brother Jason, Giambi attended South Hills High School in West Covina, California. He attended California State University, Fullerton and played college baseball for the Cal State Fullerton Titans. The Titans won the 1995 College World Series. In 1994, he played collegiate summer baseball with the Bourne Braves of the Cape Cod Baseball League and was named a league all-star.

Professional athletic career 
The Kansas City Royals selected Giambi in the sixth round of the 1996 Major League Baseball Draft. Giambi made his major league debut as a September call-up for the Royals in 1998. The Athletics acquired Giambi from the Royals in exchange for Brett Laxton prior to the 2000 season. Jason and Jeremy played together during the 2000 and 2001 seasons. During Game 3 of the 2001 American League Division Series, Giambi was tagged out at home plate on the "flip play" by Derek Jeter.

During the 2002 season, the Athletics traded Giambi to the Philadelphia Phillies for John Mabry. Giambi finished the 2002 season with 20 home runs between the Athletics and Phillies. After the 2002 season, the Phillies traded Giambi to the Boston Red Sox for Josh Hancock. He last played in the majors in 2003 for the Red Sox. After being released by the Red Sox, Giambi signed minor league deals with the Los Angeles Dodgers in 2004 and the Chicago White Sox in 2005. In his MLB career, Giambi batted .263 with 52 home runs and 209 RBIs.

Steroids 
On March 13, 2005, The Kansas City Star reported that Giambi had admitted to having used anabolic steroids. His brother Jason has also admitted to using steroids according to grand jury testimony that was leaked to the press. On December 13, 2007, Giambi was named in the Mitchell Report on steroid usage in baseball as being among the athletes to whom BALCO founder Victor Conte claimed to have sold anabolic steroids; the report said BALCO VP Jim Valente had indicated that urine samples submitted to BALCO by both Jeremy and Jason had tested positive for the steroid drugs.

Personal life and death

Giambi was mentioned in Michael Lewis's book Moneyball, and he became a character in the film that starred Brad Pitt, with Giambi portrayed by Nick Porrazzo. 

Giambi was found dead at his parents' home in Claremont, California, on the morning of February 9, 2022, according to a spokesperson for the Claremont Police Department. He was 47. The following day, the Los Angeles County Medical Examiner announced that Giambi's death had been ruled a suicide via a gunshot wound to his chest. In June 2022, reports say that prior to the suicide, in August 2021, he was "struck in the head by a baseball and fractured his zygomatic bone" when serving as a pitching coach. His mother also said he felt different after the injury.

See also 

 List of doping cases in sport
 List of Major League Baseball players named in the Mitchell Report

References

External links 

Jeremy Giambi at Baseball Almanac

1974 births
2022 deaths
2022 suicides
Major League Baseball right fielders
Major League Baseball left fielders
Major League Baseball first basemen
Oakland Athletics players
Kansas City Royals players
Philadelphia Phillies players
Boston Red Sox players
Baseball players from San Jose, California
Birmingham Barons players
Charlotte Knights players
Gulf Coast Dodgers players
Lansing Lugnuts players
Las Vegas 51s players
Omaha Golden Spikes players
Omaha Royals players
Pawtucket Red Sox players
Sacramento River Cats players
Spokane Indians players
Wichita Wranglers players
Cal State Fullerton Titans baseball players
Bourne Braves players
People from Covina, California
American people of Italian descent
Suicides by firearm in California